Alpha Gamma Sigma (AGS), founded in 1926 by Dr. William T. Boyce at Fullerton College, is the honor society of the California Community Colleges system.  It was conceived as "an intellectual stimulus, comparable to that of Phi Beta Kappa in the higher colleges"  for what were then called junior colleges in California.

AGS supports its members in defining and reaching their goals by encouraging achievement and community service, building social and professional networks, and providing the information and focus needed for success.

Motto 
Α - Alpha: Arête, good character or virtue or "excellence"          
Γ - Gamma: Gnosis, knowledge            
Σ - Sigma: Sophrosyne, good judgment or "wisdom"           
Hence the AGS motto: "Add to good character, knowledge and judgment."

Campus AGS Chapters 
Colleges that have chartered Alpha Gamma Sigma chapters can be seen on the Chapter Membership page of the AGS Website. All chapters must remit part of their local dues to AGS Inc. for the support of scholarships and some administrative expenses. To remain in good standing, chapters must also submit annually to AGS, Inc. a list of those students who have achieved "Permanent Member" status.

Each chapter sets requirements for participation that include meeting attendance, educational enrichment activities, and school or community service. Most community colleges with chapters award transcript recognition to students who have met those requirements.

Membership Eligibility
Students enrolled in a California community college with an active AGS chapter are eligible for membership if they have:
completed, within the past two years, of 12 graded units, in a maximum of 3 semesters or 5 quarters, at any recognized institution of higher education and
earned a grade point average of 3.0 or better from the previous semester and a cumulative grade point average of 3.0 or better, or have Life Membership (3.5 GPA or better) in the California Scholarship Federation (the state's high school honor society).

Permanent Membership 
Students may earn Permanent Membership if they have:

 completed 60 semester or 90 quarter units in degree-applicable courses, at least half of which were completed at a community college, with at least 54 semester or 81 quarter units graded rather than Pass/NoPass, and
 maintained a cumulative GPA of at least 3.5 and been an active member for at least one term or maintained a cumulative GPA of at least 3.25 and been an active member for at least two terms, and
 applied for this status through their local chapter's process.

Scholarships
Alpha Gamma Sigma, Inc. annually awards scholarships in two categories: service and academic excellence. There are multiple awards in each category each year unless a number is specified below. 

Service Awards
 The Walsh applicant who receives the highest rating earns the Randy Taylor Award.
 The two Walsh applicants who receive the next highest ratings earn the Charles Bell Service Award
Academic Awards
 The Kathleen D. Loly Scholarship Award recognizes Alpha Gamma Sigma's most outstanding scholars. 
 The two Loly applicants who receive the highest ratings earn the Virginia Coffey Award.
 The Robert Mantovani Award recognizes those Loly applicants who have "provided outstanding service and leadership to their chapters, campuses, and communities." 
 The Tom Jackson Award recognizes the top Mantovani Award winner.

AGS State Advisory Board
The State Advisory Board is composed of the advisors of all chapters in good standing as well as any retired former advisors who accept the Board's invitation to continue serving. Each active chapter has one vote on SAB matters.

AGS Board of Trustees
The Board of Trustees of Alpha Gamma Sigma, Inc. consists of current for former members of the SAB elected by that body, plus two student members, one from each region, elected by the General Assembly of Delegates at the Spring Convention. AGS, Inc. is a non-profit corporation.
 Campuses in the California Community Colleges System

References

External links
Alpha Gamma Sigma State Organization

Two-year college honor societies
California Community Colleges
Student organizations established in 1926
1926 establishments in California